William Blume Levy (born 14 January 2001) is a Danish professional road cyclist, who currently rides for UCI ProTeam .

Major results

2018
 2nd Overall Tour du Pays de Vaud
1st Young rider classification
1st Stage 2
 3rd La Route des Géants
 3rd Johan Museeuw Classic
 4th Overall Sint-Martinusprijs Kontich
1st Stage 3a (ITT)
 5th Junior Tour of Flanders
2019
 1st Junior Tour of Flanders
 National Junior Road Championships
3rd Road race
3rd Time trial
 3rd Overall Tour du Pays de Vaud
2021
 1st Gylne Gutuer
 10th Overall Flanders Tomorrow Tour
2022
 8th Grand Prix Alanya

References

External links

2001 births
Living people
Danish male cyclists
People from Horsens
Sportspeople from the Central Denmark Region